Ceforanide is a second-generation cephalosporin antibiotic.

See also
 Cefotiam

References

External links
 
 
 

Cephalosporin antibiotics
Enantiopure drugs
Tetrazoles